Cryptophagini is a tribe of silken fungus beetles in the family Cryptophagidae. There are about 8 genera and at least 60 described species in Cryptophagini.

Genera
 Antherophagus Dejean, 1821
 Cryptophagus Herbst, 1792
 Henoticus Thomson, 1868
 Henotiderus Reitter, 1877
 Myrmedophila Bousquet, 1989
 Pteryngium Reitter, 1887
 Salebius Casey, 1900
 Telmatophilus Heer, 1841

References

Further reading

 
 
 
 

Cryptophagidae